The Franklin O-235 (company designation 4A-235 and Sport 4) is an American air-cooled aircraft engine that first ran in the mid-1960s. The engine is of four-cylinder, horizontally-opposed layout and displaced . The power output is nominally .

Variants
4A-235 at 2,800 rpm

Sport 4 at 2,800 rpm

Applications
Duruble Edelweiss
Hollman Sportster 
MacFam Cavalier
Practavia Sprite
PZL-110 Koliber
Rallye-Club
Skystar Kitfox
Stewart Foo Fighter

Specifications (4A4-235)

See also

References

Notes

Bibliography

 Gunston, Bill. (1986) World Encyclopedia of Aero Engines. Patrick Stephens: Wellingborough. p. 57

Franklin aircraft engines
1960s aircraft piston engines
Boxer engines